Bars4Justice (also #Bars4Justice) is a 2015 American short documentary film directed by Samoan filmmaker Queen Muhammad Ali and Hakeem Khaaliq. The film was recorded in Ferguson, Missouri during the first anniversary of the shooting of Michael Brown August 9–10, 2015. The film is an official selection of several international festivals including winning Best Short documentary at the 24th annual Pan African Film Festival in Los Angeles, Glasgow Short Film Festival in Scotland, Tirana International Film Festival (DOCUTIFF) in Albania, and The Museum of Modern Art (MoMA) in midtown Manhattan NY.

Cast
 Common – Himself
 Talib Kweli – Himself
 Cornel West – Himself
 Jasiri X – Himself
 Renita Lamkin – Herself
 Rahiel Tesfamariam – Herself
 Rabbi Susan Talve – herself

Accolades

References

External links
 
 

2015 films
Films about racism
American independent films
2015 independent films
Hip hop activists
2010s hip hop films
Documentary films about African Americans
Documentary films about American politics
Documentary films about race and ethnicity in the United States
2010s English-language films
2010s American films